The Middle Rhine Cup (German: Mittelrheinpokal) is a German football club Cup competition open to teams from the Lower Rhine region of the state of North Rhine-Westphalia. The competition is one of the 21 regional cup competitions of German football and acts as a qualifier to the following seasons' German Cup.

The competition is sponsored by the Bitburger brewery and carries the official name Bitburger Mittelrheinpokal. It is operated by the Middle Rhine Football Association, the FVM.

Modus
Clubs from fully professional leagues are not permitted to enter the competition, meaning, no teams from the Fußball-Bundesliga and the 2nd Bundesliga can compete.

All clubs from the Middle Rhine playing in the 3. Liga (III) and the Regionalliga West (IV) are directly qualified for the first round, the remaining places are filled with the teams who qualified from local cup competitions, the Kreispokale. All up, 32 clubs take part in the first round of the competition.

Since the establishment of the 3. Liga in 2008, reserve teams can not take part in the German Cup or the Middle Rhine Cup anymore.

Winners
The winners of the competition since 1993:

References

Sources
Deutschlands Fußball in Zahlen,  An annual publication with tables and results from the Bundesliga to Verbandsliga/Landesliga, publisher: DSFS

External links
Fussball.de: Middle Rhine Cup 
Bitburger-Pokal  FVM website

Football cup competitions in Germany
Football competitions in North Rhine-Westphalia